Fillmore West 1969 is a three-CD live album by the rock band the Grateful Dead.  It contain selected songs recorded at the Fillmore West in San Francisco on February 27 through March 2, 1969.  The album was remixed and remastered from the original 16-track concert soundboard tapes.  The album is packaged as a hardcover booklet, with photos of the band and an essay by Dennis McNally.

In addition to the three-disc set, the entire run of four nights was released as The Complete Fillmore West 1969, a 10-CD box set that was limited to 10,000 copies.

Five of the seven songs on Live/Dead (rock's first 16-track live album, released in November 1969) were taken from these shows.  Fillmore West 1969 includes highlights that did not appear on Live/Dead, with the exception of "Feedback" and the full-length version of "And We Bid You Good Night", which had appeared in truncated form on that album.

Critical reception

On AllMusic Lindsay Planer wrote, "Collectively [the Grateful Dead in 1969] created an incendiary ensemble embracing R&B with the same passion and sense of intrepid experimentation as they did their own unique imprint of sonic psychedelia. And nowhere is that seemingly odd amalgam as evident as it is here.... Three and a half decades later those tapes were revisited and revitalized by longtime Grateful Dead producer Jeffrey Norman."

Track listing

Personnel
Grateful Dead
Tom Constanten - organ
Jerry Garcia - lead guitar, vocals
Mickey Hart - drums
Bill Kreutzmann - drums
Phil Lesh - electric bass, vocals
Ron "Pigpen" McKernan - harmonica, organ, percussion, vocals
Bob Weir - rhythm guitar, vocals

Production
David Lemieux – producer
Cameron Sears – executive producer
Bob Matthews – recording engineer
Betty Cantor – recording engineer
Jeffrey Norman – mixing, mastering, producer
Eileen Law – archival research
Rosie McGee – photography
Herb Greene – photography
Michael Merritt – photography
Baron Wolman – photography
Peter Simon – photography
Amalie R. Rothschild – photography
Suanne C Skidd – photography
Sylvia Clarke Hamilton – photography
Richard Biffle – cover lettering
Brian Connors – art coordination
Robert Minkin – package design
Dennis McNally – booklet essay

References

Grateful Dead live albums
2005 live albums
Rhino Entertainment live albums